Dr. Cándido Pérez, Ladies (Dr. Cándido Pérez, señoras) is a 1962 Argentine film. The film was inspiration for Mexican comedian Jorge Ortiz de Pinedo's long-running sitcom, Dr. Cándido Pérez.

Cast

External links
 

1962 films
1960s Spanish-language films
Argentine black-and-white films
1960s Argentine films
Films directed by Emilio Vieyra